NIB, nib or NiB may refer to:

 Nib (pen), the writing tip of a pen
 The Nib, an online comic
 Nib, partially processed cocoa bean
 Twizzlers Nibs, a candy
 Neodymium magnet or NIB (neodymium, iron, boron)
 N.I.B., a song by Black Sabbath
 .nib, Apple Interface Builder file format
 Net insurance benefit
 NiB, nickel boron, an electroless nickel alloy

In companies and organizations:

 National Irish Bank
 National Intercollegiate Band
 Nordic Investment Bank
 nib Health Funds, Australasia
 New Iberia (Amtrak station), Louisiana, US, station code
 National Internet Backbone NIB-II, the BSNL internet backbone
 Nagasaki International Television, Japan